Garw S.B.G.C. (Garw Seniors, Boys and Girls Club) is a football club based in the village of Pontycymer, near Bridgend, Wales who are currently playing in the South Wales Alliance League Premier Division.

History
The club was formed in 1945 as Garw Athletic. They joined the Welsh Football League in 1952 and played in the league continuously until the end of 2009–10 when they were relegated out of the league. The club were champions of Welsh Football League Division Two in 2000–01 and 2006–07. The club changed its name to Garw S.B.G.C in 2008–09.  The club then played in the South Wales Senior League, before joining the South Wales Alliance League where they were Division Two champions in 2016–17 and runners-up in Division One in 2017–18.

Welsh Football League history
Information in this section is sourced from the Football Club History Database and the Welsh Soccer Archive.

Notes

Honours

Welsh Football League Division Two (Tier 3 Welsh Football Pyramid) - Champions: 2000–01; 2006–07
Welsh Football League Division One (Tier 3 Welsh Football League) - Champions: 1988-89 
Welsh Football League Division Two (Tier 3 Welsh Football League) - Runners-Up: 1976-77 
Welsh Football League Division Three (Tier 4 Welsh Football Pyramid) - Champions: 1999–2000
South Wales Alliance League Division One - Runners-Up: 2017–18  
South Wales Alliance League Division Two - Champions: 2016–17

Current squad

References

External links
 Club Twitter

Football clubs in Wales
Association football clubs established in 1945
1945 establishments in Wales
Welsh Football League clubs
South Wales Alliance League clubs
South Wales Senior League clubs
Football clubs in Bridgend County Borough